The men's discus throw event at the 2002 Commonwealth Games was held on 26–27 July.

Medalists

Results

Qualification
Qualification: 60.00 m (Q) or at least 12 best (q) qualified for the final.

Final

References
Official results
Results at BBC

Discus
2002